Daniel Aníbal Hernández (born 5 February 1970 in Tucumán, Argentina) is an Argentine former  footballer who played as a midfielder for clubs in Argentina, Bolivia and Chile.

Teams
  Independiente 1988–1989
  Bolívar 1990–1992
  Atlético Tucumán 1993–1994
  San Martín de Tucumán 1994–1996
  Godoy Cruz de Mendoza 1996–1997
  Talleres de Córdoba 1997–1998
  San Martín de Tucumán 1999–2000
  Juventud Antoniana 2000
  Coquimbo Unido 2001–2002
  San Martín de Tucumán 2002–2004
  Independiente de La Rioja 2005
  Concepción FC 2005
  Destroyers 2006

References
 

1970 births
Living people
Argentine footballers
Argentine expatriate footballers
Argentina international footballers
Club Atlético Independiente footballers
San Martín de Tucumán footballers
Talleres de Córdoba footballers
Juventud Antoniana footballers
Atlético Tucumán footballers
Godoy Cruz Antonio Tomba footballers
Coquimbo Unido footballers
Club Destroyers players
Club Bolívar players
Chilean Primera División players
Argentine Primera División players
Expatriate footballers in Chile
Expatriate footballers in Bolivia
Association football midfielders
Sportspeople from Tucumán Province